Austropusilla is a genus of sea snails, marine gastropod mollusks in the family Raphitomidae.

Distribution
This marine genus used to be  endemic to Australia and occurs off New South Wales, Tasmania and Victoria. A. simoniana occurs off the Cape Province, South Africa.

Species
Species within the genus Austropusilla include:
 Austropusilla hilum (Hedley, 1908)
 Austropusilla profundis Laseron, 1954
 Austropusilla simoniana Kilburn, 1974
Synonyms
 subgenus Austropusilla (Metaclathurella) Shuto, 1983: synonym of Otitoma Jousseaume, 1898
 Austropusilla crokerensis Shuto, 1983: synonym of Otitoma crokerensis (Shuto, 1983) (original combination)

References

 Laseron, C. 1954. Revision of the New South Wales Turridae (Mollusca). Australian Zoological Handbook. Sydney : Royal Zoological Society of New South Wales pp. 56, pls 1–12.
 Powell, A.W.B. 1966. The molluscan families Speightiidae and Turridae, an evaluation of the valid taxa, both Recent and fossil, with list of characteristic species. Bulletin of the Auckland Institute and Museum. Auckland, New Zealand 5: 1–184, pls 1–23

External links
  Bouchet, P.; Kantor, Y. I.; Sysoev, A.; Puillandre, N. (2011). A new operational classification of the Conoidea (Gastropoda). Journal of Molluscan Studies. 77(3): 273-308
 Worldwide Mollusc Species Data Base: Raphitomidae
 

 
Raphitomidae
Gastropod genera